James "Bruiser" Flint (born July 23, 1965) is an American men's college basketball coach, currently an assistant coach at Kentucky. He was most recently the head coach at Drexel University in west Philadelphia, where he was born and raised.

Collegiate playing career
Flint is a 1987 graduate of Saint Joseph's University. While attending St. Joe's, Flint was a member of the school's varsity basketball team. Flint was named to the all-Atlantic 10 team as a senior, and was inducted into the St. Joe's athletic hall of fame in 1988.

Early coaching career
In 1987, Flint became an assistant coach at Coppin State University. Two years later, Flint became an assistant coach under John Calipari at the University of Massachusetts Amherst (or UMass). After Calipari left UMass for the NBA in 1996, Flint was named his successor, becoming the school's 17th head coach. While coach of the Minutemen, Flint compiled an overall record of 86–72.  He won an NABC District Coach of the Year award in 1998. Facing pressure after being unable to maintain the Minutemen's level of success that they enjoyed under Calipari, Flint resigned from UMass after the 2000–01 season.

Later coaching career
Flint became the head coach at Drexel on April 5, 2001, succeeding Steve Seymour, who had been fired that March after failing to make the NCAA Tournament in either of his two seasons as head coach. Flint's hiring at Drexel coincided with Drexel's move from the America East Conference, where the school had enjoyed a sustained level of success under former head coach Bill Herrion, to the Colonial Athletic Association (or CAA).

During his tenure at Drexel, Flint was named CAA coach of the year four times (2002, 2004, 2009, 2012). He also won an NABC District Coach of the Year award three times (2007, 2009, 2012). Under Flint, Drexel made five NIT appearances. In 2012, the school won its first CAA Regular Season Championship in 2012, but lost to VCU in the finals of the Conference Tournament. On Selection Sunday, Drexel narrowly missed an at-large berth in the NCAA Tournament.  On March 7, 2016, following the end of Drexel's season, Flint was fired as head basketball coach after 15 seasons with the team.  At the time of his firing, he was the all–time winningest coach in Drexel basketball history.

Head coaching record

References

External links
 

1965 births
Living people
African-American basketball coaches
African-American basketball players
American men's basketball coaches
American men's basketball players
Basketball coaches from Pennsylvania
Basketball players from Philadelphia
College men's basketball head coaches in the United States
Coppin State Eagles men's basketball coaches
Drexel Dragons men's basketball coaches
Episcopal Academy alumni
Indiana Hoosiers men's basketball coaches
Kentucky Wildcats men's basketball coaches
Saint Joseph's Hawks men's basketball players
UMass Minutemen basketball coaches
21st-century African-American people
20th-century African-American sportspeople